The Hes Case (Dutch: De smaak van water, also known as The Taste of Water) is a 1982 Dutch drama film written and directed by Orlow Seunke, at his feature film debut.

The film premiered at the 39th edition of the Venice Film Festival in which it won the Silver Lion for Best First Work, and which later was the recipient of several other accolades including the Critics' Award at the Toronto Film Festival and the Bronze Hugo Award at the Chicago International Film Festival.  The film is loosely based on the novel The Case Worker (aka The Visitor) by György Konrád; originally intended as a faithful adaptation of the novel, during the four years of scriptwriting process the screenplay underwent various changes, notably going to include some Seunke's autobiographical events.

Plot

Cast 

 Gerard Thoolen - Hes
 Dorijn Curvers - Anna
 Joop Admiraal - Schram
 Hans van Tongeren - Intern
 Olga Zuiderhoek - Hes' wife
 Moniek Toebosch - Prostitute
 Standa Bares - Neighbour
 René Groothof - Man in café
 Ab Abspoel - Doorman 
 Bram van der Vlugt - Furnishing director  
 Peer Mascini - Supervisor

References

External links
 
 

1982 films
Dutch drama films
1982 drama films 
Films based on novels